Dennis Dun (born April 19, 1952) is an American actor.

Early life and education
Dun is from Stockton, California. He is of Chinese descent.

Film and TV
Dun has had prominent roles in several films, notably Year of the Dragon (1985), Big Trouble in Little China (1986), The Last Emperor (1987), Prince of Darkness (1987), and Thousand Pieces of Gold (1991), Warriors of Virtue (1997). In addition he has appeared in independent Asian American projects such as My American Vacation (1999) and My Life Disoriented (2006). For three seasons he was a regular cast member on the NBC television series Midnight Caller (1988–1991).

Theatre
Dun began acting at the Asian American Theater Company in San Francisco, California. He has appeared onstage at East West Players, Berkeley Repertory Theatre, and Lodestone Theatre Ensemble. For his performance in Chay Yew's A Language of Their Own at the Celebration Theatre, he won an LA Weekly Theater Award for Ensemble Performance (shared with Noel Alumit, Anthony David and Chris Tashima). He has participated in both the film and theatre labs at the Sundance Institute. 

Dun wrote and performed the one-man show Giant Oranges, commissioned by the Mark Taper Forum and produced by Chay Yew's Solo Works Festival in Los Angeles.

Personal life
Dun resides in Los Angeles, California.

Filmography

References

External links
 
 Dennis Dun bio on www.mylifedisoriented.com

1952 births
Living people
American male film actors
American male television actors
American male voice actors
American male stage actors
American male actors of Chinese descent
American dramatists and playwrights of Chinese descent
Male actors from California
People from Stockton, California